Streptomyces ferralitis is a Gram-positive, aerobic bacterium species from the genus of Streptomyces which has been isolated from ultramafic soil in New Caledonia.

See also 
 List of Streptomyces species

References

Further reading

External links
Type strain of Streptomyces ferralitis at BacDive -  the Bacterial Diversity Metadatabase

ferralitis
Bacteria described in 2004